Edmund Abaka is a photographer and historian of Africa at the University of Miami in Coral Gables, Florida.

He is a graduate of the University of Cape Coast in Ghana and received his master's from the University of Guelph in Canada. He received his PhD from York University in 1998.

He is a Fulbright scholar.

Selected publications
 "Kola is God's Gift": Agricultural Production, Export Initiatives and the Kola Industry of Asante and the Gold Coast, c. 1820–1950. Ohio University Press, Athens, 2005. (Western African Studies)
 Culture And Customs of Ethiopia. 2007
 House of Slaves and "Door of No Return": Gold Coast/Ghana Slave Forts, Castles & Dungeons and the Atlantic Slave Trade. University of Wisconsin Press
 W. E. B. Du Bois on Africa (edited with Eugene F. Provenzo)

References

External links

https://www.researchgate.net/profile/Edmund_Abaka
http://eabaka.tripod.com/

Living people
Year of birth missing (living people)
University of Miami faculty
Historians of Africa
York University alumni
University of Cape Coast alumni
University of Guelph alumni
Ghanaian photographers
Place of birth missing (living people)
Nationality missing
Ghanaian emigrants to the United States
Historians from Florida